The Pajaronian (formerly the Register-Pajaronian) is a newspaper based in Watsonville, California in Santa Cruz County on California's Central Coast. The Register-Pajaronian is published weekly every Friday, but was for many years a daily paper.  The newspaper has a circulation of 5,000 and covers the Watsonville City Council, the Pajaro Valley Unified School District and the Santa Cruz County Farm Bureau.  The newspaper's coverage area includes the cities of Aptos, Corralitos, Watsonville, Pajaro, Aromas and most of North Monterey County.  Tony Nunez is the managing editor of the Register-Pajaronian, which is owned by Santa Cruz-based Good Times .

History
The newspaper's roots trace back to 1868 when the Pajaronian was first published by J.A. Cottle.  In 1894, a competing weekly newspaper owned by George W. Peckham began publishing daily and changed its name to the Register.  In 1919, the Register was purchased by future Watsonville mayor Fred W. Atkinson, who then purchased the Pajaronian in 1930.  After his death the two papers were purchased by the Scripps syndicate and consolidated into the Register-Pajaronian in 1940.

The Pajaronian has been instrumental in launching the careers of numerous career journalists, among them Good Times editor Steve Palopoli and San Francisco Magazine's Ian Stewart. Wes Gallagher worked as a sports writer for the Register-Pajaronian before becoming an Associated Press reporter in 1937 at its Buffalo, N.Y. bureau and was dispatched to become a war correspondent when World War II began.  He was in Denmark when the Nazis invaded in 1940 and followed with many more reports close to the front when the United States entered the conflict. In 1946, he covered the Nuremberg trials for the Associated Press, and when the verdicts were announced, Gallagher got his report out first by dashing a long distance to his wife who was waiting with an active phone.  In 1962, he became the AP's general manager and president, serving until 1976.

Pulitzer Prize
In 1956 the Register-Pajaronian won the Pulitzer Prize for Public Service for an investigative series by photographer Sam Vestal, working under the leadership of its longtime editor Frank Orr and with assistance of Watsonville Police Chief Frank Osmer.  These revelations led to the resignation of Santa Cruz County District Attorney Charles Moore, and the arrest and conviction of one of his associates.

Scripps Howard
The national newspaper firm Scripps created the Register-Pajaronian upon the purchase of the two Watsonville newspapers in 1940. E.W, Scripp's former secretary, Fullerton News Tribune publisher Edgar F. Elfstrom, was a minority partner in the Register-Pajaronian. Scripps maintained ownership of the publication for 55 years.

NewsMedia Corp
Scripps sold the Register-Pajaronian to News Media Corp in 1995. In 2003, under the leadership of editor Jon Chown, articles by reporter Dave M. Brooks led to the ousting of Watsonville Mayor Richard de La Paz for his involvement in a bar room brawl. De la Cruz was later sentenced to six months in jail.

Aptos Life began publishing in 2012.

The Pajaronian celebrated its 150th anniversary in 2018.

Return to local ownership
Santa Cruz's Good Times weekly purchased the Pajaronian from News Media Corp.  on July 1, 2019, marking its return to local ownership for the first time in 78 years.

Under the direction of longtime Bay Area publisher Dan Pulcrano, the staff was retained but some changes were made. Its original name, The Pajaronian, was restored, a new logo was introduced, the office was moved back to downtown Watsonville and a weekly lifestyle magazine, Pajaro Valley, began publishing.

References

External links
 Official website

Weekly newspapers published in California
Pulitzer Prize-winning newspapers
Watsonville, California
Publications established in 1868
1868 establishments in California
Pulitzer Prize for Public Service winners